The Isaac Glover House is located in Haddon Heights, Camden County, New Jersey, United States. The house was built  and added to the National Register of Historic Places on September 23, 1994.

See also
National Register of Historic Places listings in Camden County, New Jersey

References

Houses on the National Register of Historic Places in New Jersey
Houses completed in 1750
Houses in Camden County, New Jersey
National Register of Historic Places in Camden County, New Jersey
Haddon Heights, New Jersey
New Jersey Register of Historic Places